BYU Studies Quarterly is an academic journal covering a broad array of topics related to the Church of Jesus Christ of Latter-day Saints (Mormon studies). It is published by the church-owned Brigham Young University. The journal is abstracted and indexed in the ATLA Religion Database.

History 
Originally proposed as Wasatch Review, the periodical was established as Brigham Young University Studies and was first printed in January 1959, as an issue of Brigham Young University Bulletin printed by BYU Press. It obtained its current name in April 2012.

Editors 
The following people have been editor-in-chief:
 Clinton F. Larson (1959–1967)
 Charles D. Tate (1968–1983)
 Edward Geary (1984–1991)
 John W. Welch (1991–2018)
 Steven C. Harper (2019–present)

See also 

 List of Latter-day Saint periodicals

References

External links
 

1959 establishments in Utah
Brigham Young University publications
Mormon apologetics
Publications established in 1959
Mormon studies journals
The Church of Jesus Christ of Latter-day Saints periodicals
Magazines published in Utah